Exel Composites Oyj (formerly known as Exel Oyj) is a Finnish technology company that designs, manufactures and markets composite profiles and tubes for industrial applications. Exel was founded in 1960 by Yrjö Aho.

The name Exel came from a combination of the words explosive electronics, with the company initially producing electric blasting caps  The company later moved onto production of sports equipment, with a focus on ski poles, before diversifying into a wider range of composite products.

References 

Manufacturing companies established in 1960
Companies listed on Nasdaq Helsinki
Finnish brands
Sporting goods manufacturers of Finland
Mäntyharju
Finnish companies established in 1960